Escorca is a municipality in northwest Mallorca, one of the Balearic Islands, Spain.

Hills
 Puig Major (1445 m)
 Puig de Massanella (1364 m)
 Puig Tomir (1102 m)
 Puig Roig (1003 m)

References

Municipalities in Mallorca
Populated places in Mallorca